Elmira is a city and the county seat of Chemung County, New York, United States. It is the principal city of the Elmira, New York, metropolitan statistical area, which encompasses Chemung County. The population was 26,523 at the 2020 census, down from 29,200 at the 2010 census, a decline of more than 7 percent.

The City of Elmira is in the south-central part of the county, surrounded on three sides by the Town of Elmira.  It is in the Southern Tier of New York, a short distance north of the Pennsylvania state line.

History

Early history 
The region of Elmira was inhabited by the Cayuga nation (also known as the Kanawaholla) of the Haudenosaunee prior to European colonization. Cayuga residing in the region maintained relations with European settlers, primarily related to the fur trade, but were otherwise relatively isolated from encroaching colonial settlements.

During the American Revolutionary War, the Sullivan Expedition of 1779 was mounted by the Continental Army against the four Haudenosaunee nations which had allied with the British. The expeditionary force fought a combined British-Haudenosaunee force at the Battle of Newtown, south of the current city, in which the Continental Army emerged victorious. After the conclusion of the war, the Haudenosaunee and the United States signed a treaty at Elmira in 1791 to settle territorial disputes in the region. Most of the Cayuga emigrated under pressure from encroaching American settlements with the other nations of the Haudenosaunee to Canada, where they resettled on land provided by the British Crown.

The first European-American settler in Elmira was Abraham Miller, who served as a captain in the Continental Army. Miller constructed a cabin after resigning just before the end of the Revolutionary War. Miller's Pond and Miller Street are named after him and are near the location of his house.

Elmira's formation 
The New York legislature established the Township of Chemung, now Chemung County, in 1788. The settlement of Newtown was soon established at the intersection of Newtown Creek and the Chemung River. In 1792, the settlement at Newtown joined with the Wisnerburg and DeWittsburg settlements to form the village of Newtown. In 1808, the village officially changed its name to the Town of Elmira, at a town meeting held at Teal's Tavern. It is said the town was named after tavern owner Nathan Teal's young daughter, but that story has never been confirmed. According to Amos Bugbee Carpenter's "Carpenter Memorial" family history book printed in 1898, Elmira is named after Major General Matthew Carpenter's daughter. This naming occurred, according to this book, in 1821 at the constitutional convention to which Matthew was a delegate. In any case, the City of Elmira, nicknamed  "The Queen City," was incorporated in 1864 from part of the town of Elmira and the village of Elmira. The remaining part of the town of Elmira exists still, surrounding the city on the west, north and east. The city and town share an intricately entwined history.

It appears that Amos Carpenter in his 1898 book was referencing an 1879 book.

Elmira served as a transportation hub for New York's Southern Tier in the 1800s, connecting commercial centers in Rochester and Buffalo with Albany and New York City, via the canal system and railroads. The city was the southern terminus of the Chemung Canal completed in 1833; later, the Junction Canal was constructed to connect Elmira with Corning, facilitating transport of coal from the Pennsylvania mines via the Northern branch of the Susquehanna Canal system. In 1849, the New York and Erie Railroad was built through Elmira, giving the area a New York City to Buffalo route. In 1850, the Elmira and Jefferson Railroad gave the area a route north and, in 1854, the Elmira and Williamsport Railroad a route south. These railroads and their connections made the city a prime location for an Army training and muster point early in the Civil War.

In 1872 construction began on the Utica, Ithaca and Elmira Railroad, eventually creating a route to Cortland and Syracuse via Horseheads, Breesport and Van Etten. The Delaware, Lackawanna and Western Railroad, completed in 1884, competed with the Erie's New York City to Buffalo line.

Prisoner-of-war camp

A great deal of the  Union installation, known as Camp Rathbun, fell into disuse as the Civil War progressed, and the camp's "Barracks #3" were converted into a Civil War prisoner of war camp in the summer of 1864. The camp, in use from June 6, 1864, until autumn 1865,  was dubbed "Hellmira" by its inmates.

In the months the site was used as a camp, 12,123 Confederate soldiers were incarcerated; of these, 2,963 died during their stay from a combination of malnutrition, prolonged exposure to brutal winter weather and disease directly attributable to the dismal sanitary conditions on Foster's Pond and lack of medical care. The camp's dead were prepared for burial and laid to rest by the sexton at Woodlawn National Cemetery, ex-slave John W. Jones. At the end of the war, each prisoner was given a loyalty oath and given a train ticket back home; the last prisoner left the camp on September 27, 1865. The camp was closed, demolished and converted to farmland. The prison camp site is today a residential area.

Reformatory and correctional facility

The state legislature authorized the building of a state prison for first offenders in 1866. It opened in 1876 as the Elmira Reformatory, under the direction of Zebulon Brockway, serving offenders aged sixteen to thirty. It was the first institution of its kind, and a model for others to follow. In 1970 the complex was renamed the Elmira Correctional and Reception Center.

Elmira economy 
In 1950, the Elmira's population peaked at about 50,000, which represented 57 percent of Chemung County's total population at the time. Today, the city has approximately 30,000 residents, which represents 34 percent of Chemung County's population. This population decline is due to the national decline in railroads and manufacturing as well as a population shift to the outer suburbs around Elmira. The Elmira Metro area has nearly 100,000 people.

The population decline began during the recession of the early 1970s during which several large employers (Ann Page, American Bridge, General Electric, American LaFrance, Westinghouse and Remington Rand) either closed their factories or moved to other states. The decline was exacerbated by the flood of 1972, during which many of the downtown businesses and single-family homes were destroyed or replaced by subsequent Urban Renewal projects in the Chemung River flood plain.

Current Manufacturing Employers 
Anchor Glass Container Corporation, headquartered in Tampa, Florida, is in the old Thatcher Glass facility in Elmira Heights. Anchor Glass produces a diverse line of flint, amber, green and other colored glass containers of various types and designs for the beer, food, beverage and liquor markets in North America. Anchor Glass is now wholly owned by the Ardagh Group S.A.

CAF-USA Inc has its main U.S. plant in Elmira Heights on the site of the former American Bridge Company. CAF USA is a subsidiary company of Construcciones y Auxiliar de Ferrocarriles, a Spanish manufacturer of passenger rail products (including trains, high-speed trains, locomotives, light rail vehicles and other rail equipment). CAF-USA Inc trains are typically designed for North America's market, based on Spanish design and technologies.

Elmira Heat Treating, established in 1962 in Elmira, offers a wide variety of heat treatment technologies to both domestic and international customers such as Hilliard Corp., Ford Motors, General Signal and others.

Hardinge, Inc. (formerly Hardinge Brothers), established in 1890 and now headquartered in Elmira, manufactures precise turning machines for the domestic and international market. Starting in 1995, Hardinge began expanding their product line and over the years has acquired L. Kellenberger & Co. AG, Hauser-Tripet-Tschudin AG, Jones & Shipman, and Usach Technologies, Inc. In 2004 they also acquired Bridgeport, world-famous for its milling machines and machining centers.

Hilliard Corporation, established in 1905, has two locations in Elmira and serves the international market in filters, brakes, clutches and starters for a variety of industrial and commercial uses as well as consumer equipment from Polaris and MTD.

Kennedy Valve, located in Elmira since 1905, is one of the world's largest manufacturers of products for waterworks distribution, potable and wastewater treatment, and fire protection system projects. They are most famous for their fire hydrants which can be found around the world. Kennedy Valve was acquired by McWane in 1988.

Trayer Products, established in 1929, manufactures parts mostly for the heavy truck industry; primarily truck chassis parts such as king pins and shackles.

Hurricane Agnes and the Flood of '72 

During the summer of 1972, Hurricane Agnes struck the eastern seaboard of the United States, causing significant damage stretching from Florida into New England. Elmira was particularly hit hard by the flood, with over an estimated $291 million in damage. Over 15,000 people had to flee the city, and approximately 5,000 homes were damaged or destroyed. Coordinated efforts between local churches and regional businesses helped with the cleanup. Operating in secrecy, Rochester, NY-based Eastman Kodak sent crews as part of Operation Rebuild. Their efforts rebuilt 78 homes and assisted in the repairs of countless others.

Elmira city leaders approached the New York State Urban Development Corporation (UDC) to lead the redevelopment of the city post-flood. With a select group of businessmen and city officials attempting to minimize public input, the UDC implemented the "New Elmira Plan". This entailed the removal of buildings along the river to create Riverside Park, and razing other buildings in the business district for two  parking garages. Altogether, forty percent of Elmira's commercial space was eliminated as part of the plan. Local citizens lamented the loss of character and vibrancy of downtown Elmira.

2012 Tornado

On July 26, 2012, an EF1 tornado touched down near Cottage Drive off of Route 352 and traveled through Golden Glow and the rest of the city. Moderate damage was seen after the storm passed and hundreds of trees and power lines were blown down. No one was injured.

Geography and climate
Elmira is at  (42.089874, −76.809559).

The Chemung River flows eastward through the city. Elmira is built almost entirely in the flood plain of the Chemung River and has suffered many floods, the worst from Hurricane Agnes in 1972. Newtown Creek, flowing from the north, joins the Chemung River at the city's southeast corner.

Interstate 86/New York State Route 17, The Southern Tier Expressway, connects with the city at Exit 56. New York State Route 14 passes through Elmira between Watkins Glen and Pennsylvania.  New York State Route 13 begins near Lake Ontario and travels through Cortland and Ithaca before ending in Elmira. New York State Route 352 begins in Elmira at Exit 56 of the Southern Tier Expressway and continues West into Corning.

Demographics

As of the census of 2000, there were 30,940 people, 11,475 households, and 6,701 families residing in the city. The population density was 4,229.5 people per square mile (1,632.0/km2). There were 12,895 housing units at an average density of 1,762.7 per square mile (680.2/km2). The racial makeup of the city was 82.03% White, 13.05% Black or African American, 0.39% Native American, 0.49% Asian, 0.03% Pacific Islander, 1.37% from other races, and 2.64% from two or more races. Hispanic or Latino of any race were 3.14% of the population.

There were 11,475 households, out of which 31.1% had children under the age of 18 living with them, 35.3% were married couples living together, 18.4% had a female householder with no husband present, and 41.6% were non-families. 34.5% of all households were made up of individuals, and 13.6% had someone living alone who was 65 years of age or older. The average household size was 2.37 and the average family size was 3.05.

In the city, the population was spread out, with 25.1% under the age of 18, 13.0% from 18 to 24, 29.9% from 25 to 44, 18.2% from 45 to 64, and 13.8% who were 65 years of age or older. The median age was 33 years. For every 100 females, there were 101.2 males. For every 100 females age 18 and over, there were 98.2 males.

The median income for a household in the city was $27,292, and the median income for a family was $33,592. Males had a median income of $31,775 versus $22,350 for females. The per capita income for the city was $14,495. About 17.9% of families and 23.1% of the population were below the poverty line, including 32.6% of those under age 18 and 12.1% of those age 65 or over.

The Elmira, NY Metropolitan Statistical Area (or Elmira MSA) is frequently used for statistical information such as labor rates and includes all of Chemung County with a population in 2000 of 90,070.

The Elmira MSA was ranked as the 59th safest place to live out of 344 Metro Areas in 2005 by Morgan Quitno Press.

The three largest ethnic groups in Elmira are Irish, German and Italian.

City government 

The city government is a Council-Manager form of government in which the City Manager is the primary administrator of the city. There is one mayor elected at large and six council members elected from each of six council districts. The term of office of the mayor and council members was two years, until a 2003 referendum extended the terms to four years (four-year terms began after the 2007 election). The mayor and council members are all part-time employees. The City Manager, City Clerk, City Chamberlain, City Assessor, and Corporation Counsel are all appointed by the City Council. All remaining department heads serve at the request of the City Manager.

There are four ZIP codes in the City of Elmira: 14901 (northside), 14902 (downtown), 14904 (southside), and 14905 (West Elmira).

Facts about city government 
 The city police department employs approximately 81 full-time officers.  The chief since 2021 is Anthony A. Alvernaz.
 The city fire department employs approximately 60 full-time firefighters and officers.
 The city animal shelter has a goal to become by 2007 a no-kill animal shelter based on a model by Tompkins County Society for the Prevention of Cruelty to Animals.
 The city received $1.4 million in Community Development Block Grant funds and $368,000 in HOME funds in FY2006-2007 from the U.S. Department of Housing and Urban Development. These funds are used for programs and projects for low-moderate income families and neighborhood blocks.
 The City of Elmira has more than 20 parks including Eldridge Park with a walking trail, restored carousel, skateboard park, and fishing lake and Wisner Park with memorials to veterans from World War I, World War II, the Vietnam War and the Fallen Officers Memorial.
 The City Manager of the City of Elmira is P. Michael Collins.
 Naming rights to the Millers Pond Park were obtained by J. Howard "Buzz" Miller, an early-20th century benevolent industrialist, when his horse "Mumbo Jumbo" won a 1912 race at the Tioga Downs horse track.

Media

Newspapers 
 Star-Gazette, daily morning newspaper owned by Gannett Co. Inc. It was Gannett's first newspaper.
 Chemung Valley Reporter, weekly newspaper based in nearby Horseheads .

Radio 
 WCIH
 WNKI
 WCBF
 WELM
 WLVY
 WPIE (studio in Elmira, tower in Trumansburg)
 WOKN
 WKPQ / WHHO (studio in Hornell)
 WLEA / WCKR (studio in Hornell)
 WECW (Elmira College Student-Run Radio Station)
 WCID
 WENI-FM
 WPGO

Television 
 WETM 18 (NBC)
 WETM-DT2 18.2 (ANT)
 WSKA 30 (PBS, simulcast of WSKG-TV) (licensed to Corning, with which Elmira shares TV market)
 WENY-TV 36 (ABC on DT1/CBS on DT2/CW on DT3 through The CW Plus) (studio in Horseheads, licensed to Elmira)
 WJKP-LD 39 (MyNetworkTV) (studio and license in Corning, with which Elmira shares TV market)
 WYDC 48 (FOX) (studio and license in Corning, with which Elmira shares TV market)

Transportation infrastructure

Public transportation 
The Chemung County Transit System operates regularly scheduled fixed route service within the City of Elmira and Village of Horseheads.  Another route links Elmira with Corning Community College, also linking passengers with the Steuben County Transit System (SCT) and Corning Erwin Area Transit System (CEATS).

Elmira is served by several intercity bus operators. New York Trailways serves Elmira on one of its routes between Binghamton and Rochester. Short Line serves Elmira on its route between Binghamton and Olean.  OurBus provides service to Elmira on a route between New York City and Niagara Falls. Fullington Trailways discontinued service between Elmira and Williamsport, Pennsylvania in April 2022.

Air transportation 
The Elmira Corning Regional Airport (IATA code ELM, ICAO code KELM) is a medium-size regional airport, and the only area airport that offers scheduled airline service.

Culture 

The City Slogan is "Honoring the Past, Building the Future". It is featured on an Entrance sign erected in 2003 into the city from Exit 56 of the Southern Tier Expressway along with other honored Elmirans including (L to R) Brian Williams, Hal Roach, Ernie Davis, Mark Twain, Eileen Collins, John Jones, and Tommy Hilfiger. The slogan was designated by Mayor Stephen Hughes following the conclusion of a slogan contest in which Marlin Stewart, Alan and Barbara Hutchinson, and James Lloyd were recognized for their contributions to the winning slogan.

On at least two hilltops near the city (mostly on Harris Hill to the northwest) pioneer pilots established the sport of gliding in America. Harris Hill is the site of the National Soaring Museum. These sites are now recognized as National Landmarks of Soaring.

 Dunn Field is a baseball stadium along the southern banks of the Chemung River. The Elmira Pioneers play at Dunn Field. Famous players and managers who have played or managed at Dunn Field include Babe Ruth, Earl Weaver, Don Zimmer, Wade Boggs, and Curt Schilling.
 Elmira College is in the city.
 In 2020, the Lake Erie College of Osteopathic Medicine plans to open a new branch of its medical school where Arnot Park is currently located.
 The Clemens Center is a concert and theater center named after Samuel Clemens, (Mark Twain).
 The Arnot Art Museum is in the downtown Civic-Historic District.
 Eldridge Park features a restored 1890s Looff Carousel
 Woodlawn Cemetery and Woodlawn National Cemetery are both in the City of Elmira in the Northwest sector. Mark Twain and his family are buried in Woodlawn Cemetery.
 The First Arena was built in Elmira in 2000 (originally opened as the Coach USA Center). It has been home to the Elmira Jackals of the UHL and ECHL from 2000 to 2017 when the team folded and the Elmira Enforcers of the FPHL from 2018 to 2021.

Historic places
The following are listed on the National Register of Historic Places:

 The John Brand Jr. House
 John Brand Sr. House
 Buildings at 104–116 West Water St.
 Chemung Canal Bank Building
 Chemung County Courthouse Complex
 Clinton–Columbia Historic District
 Elmira Civic Historic District
 Elmira Coca-Cola Bottling Company Works
 Elmira College Old Campus
 Emmanuel Episcopal Church
 Erste Deutsche Evangelische Kirche
 Alexander Eustace House
 Fire Station No. 4
 William S. Gerity House
 F. M. Howell and Company
 John W. Jones House
 Maple Avenue Historic District
 Near Westside Historic District
 Newtown Battlefield State Park
 Park Church
 Pentecostal Holy Temple Church of Jesus Christ
 Pratt House
 Quarry Farm
 St. Patrick's Parochial Residence-Convent and School
 Trinity Church
 Woodlawn Cemetery and Woodlawn National Cemetery

Notable people
 Tedd Arnold, author and illustrator
 John Arnot, Jr., politician, Civil War soldier
 Elizabeth Frawley Bagley, U.S. Ambassador to Brazil
 Charlie Baker, Governor of Massachusetts
 Ray W. Barker, Major General, US Army
 James R. Beckwith, Wisconsin state assembly
 Simeon Benjamin (1792—1868), businessman, philanthropist, and benefactor of Elmira College
 Zebulon Brockway (1827–1920) known as the "Father of prison reform," directed the Elmira Reformatory
 Olivia "Livy" Langdon Clemens, wife of Mark Twain
 Chip Coffey, psychic, television personality
 Frederick Collin, lawyer, judge, Mayor of Elmira
 Eileen Collins, astronaut
 Harriet Maxwell Converse, author, folklorist, Native American civil rights advocate
 Clara Cook, All-American Girls Professional Baseball League player
 Ernie Davis, football player, first African-American Heisman Trophy winner (1961)
 Alexander S. Diven, former US Army officer and Congressman
 Cullen Douglas, actor, director and producer
 Stan Drulia, ice hockey player and coach
 Jacob Sloat Fassett, politician
 Clyde Fitch, playwright
 Thomas S. Flood, former US Congressman
 Dan Forrest, Jr., composer
 John Franchi, mixed martial arts fighter
 Henry Friendly, judge, U.S. Court of Appeals for the Second Circuit
 Burt Gillett, director of animated films
 Charles Tomlinson Griffes, composer
 Sam Groom, actor
 Jason Butler Harner, actor
 Bud Heine, former Baseball player for the New York Giants.
 Lewis Henry, former US Congressman
 Bruce Heyman, former U.S. Ambassador to Canada
 Tommy Hilfiger, fashion designer
 Molly Huddle, Olympic runner
 John W. Jones, underground railroad agent
 Matt Knowles, pro wrestler
 Warren D. Leary, Wisconsin State Assemblyman and newspaper publisher
 Kirt Manwaring, former Major League Baseball player
 Charles Thomas McMillen, basketball player, politician
 Norman A. Mordue, QB Syracuse University. Served with 1stAirCav Viet Nam. Currently U.S. Federal Judge 3rd District, Syracuse, NY
 Anna Campbell Palmer (1854–1928), author, editor
 William P. Perry, producer and composer
 Aurora Phelps,  land reformer, labor leader, women's rights advocate
 Beth Phoenix, WWE Hall of Famer
 Jeanine Pirro, television host, author, and former New York State judge, prosecutor, and politician
 Jeff Plate, drummer for Trans-Siberian Orchestra
 Margaret L. Plunkett (1906-2000), labor economist, diplomat
 Hal Roach, film producer
 Jane Roberts, writer and psychic - (1929–1984), author, psychic and trance or spirit medium.
 Hosea H. Rockwell, former US Congressman
 Francis Asbury Roe, naval officer
 Alice J. Shaw, whistling performer in vaudeville
 Frederick B. Shaw, U.S. Army brigadier general
 Joey Sindelar, pro golfer
 Horace B. Smith, former US Congressman
 Esther Baker Steele (1835–1911), educator, author, traveler, philanthropist
 Joel Dorman Steele, educator, writer
 John Surratt, son of Mary Surratt
 Art Sykes, boxer
 Mark Twain, writer
 Asher Tyler, former US Congressman
 Lewis Sayre Van Duzer, US Navy officer
Antha Minerva Virgil, composer and inventor
 John Joseph Wantuck, US Marine awarded Navy Cross
 Bob Waterfield, college and pro football player, husband of actress Jane Russell
 Brian Williams, television news anchor
Jason Wise, actor
 Don Zimmer, Major League Baseball player and manager

References

External links

 City of Elmira website
 Chemung County Chamber of Commerce
 Tri-Counties Genealogy & History: Town & City of Elmira, Chemung County NY
 Union Civil War Prison at Elmira
 John W. Jones Museum

Elmira, New York 
Cities in New York (state)
County seats in New York (state)
Populated places established in 1791
Cities in Chemung County, New York
1791 establishments in New York (state)